Braddell may refer to:

Places
 Braddell Bus Park, bus park in Toa Payoh, Singapore
 Braddell Heights Single Member Constituency, former constituency in Singapore
 Braddell Heights Symphony Orchestra, orchestra founded based in Singapore
 Braddell MRT station, rapid transit station located in the northern part of Toa Payoh, Singapore
 Braddell Secondary School, government secondary school in Singapore
 Braddell-Westlake Secondary School, government secondary school in Singapore

People
 Darcy Braddell, pseudonym of the writer Dorothy Braddell
 Dorothy Braddell (1889–1981), British writer and designer 
 Maurice Braddell, actor in the movie Men of Tomorrow
 Robert Braddell (1888–1965), English cricketer
 Thomas Braddell (1823–1891), Irish lawyer and the first Attorney-General of the British Colony of Singapore